Pelin Esmer (born 1972, Istanbul) is a Turkish screenwriter and director.

Career
Pelin Esmer studied anthropology at the social sciences department of Boğaziçi University in Istanbul. She made her first short documentary, Koleksiyoncu (The Collector) about her uncle Mithat Esmer, who is also the main character of her first fiction feature, 10 to 11 (2009). Her 2005 work, Oyun, was filmed in Arslanköy and documents the efforts of a group of peasant women who produce a play based on their lives. Her 2012 film, Watchtower, earned five awards, including Best Director at the Adana Golden Boll Film Festival.

Filmography
2002 Koleksiyoncu: The Collector (documentary)
2005 Oyun (documentary)
2009 10 to 11
2012 Watchtower
2017 Something Useful
2019 Queen Lear

Awards
Yilmaz Güney Award at the Adana Golden Boll Film Festival 2006 (for Oyun)
Best film from the Black Sea region 2006 (for Oyun)
Best film and best script at the Adana Golden Boll Film Festival 2009 (for 10 to 11)
Best young filmmaker from the Middle East region at the Middle East Film Festival Abu Dhabi in 2009 (for 10 to 11)

References

External links
 

1972 births
Living people
Boğaziçi University alumni
Turkish female screenwriters
Turkish women film directors